Goulston is a surname. Notable people with the surname include:

Mark Goulston (born 1948), American psychiatrist 
Theodore Goulston (1572–1632), English physician and scholar

See also 
Goulston Street graffito, writing on a wall associated with the 1888 Whitechapel murders investigation